James Martin (born 4 October 1994) is a Scottish professional footballer who plays as a striker for Fauldhouse United. Martin previously played for Hamilton Academical, K.V. Turnhout and Partick Thistle.

Career

Hamilton
In July 2011, whilst a member of the Hamilton's under 17 squad, he signed a professional contract with the club. On 17 January 2012, whilst still a member of the under 19 squad, Martin made his first team debut as a substitute in a 1–0 defeat to St Mirren in the Scottish Cup. He went on to make his first league appearance for Hamilton on 10 March, playing from the start in a 2–0 defeat to Ross County. On 13 March 2012, he signed a new contract, extending his stay with the club until 2014. On 29 May 2013 Martin's contract was cancelled by mutual consent.

Partick Thistle
On 23 July 2013, Martin signed for Scottish Premiership side Partick Thistle. He was given the squad number 35.

K.V. Turnhout
On 31 January 2014, Martin signed for K.V. Turnhout on loan until the end of the 2013–14 season.

Career statistics

References

Living people
1994 births
Scottish footballers
Association football forwards
Hamilton Academical F.C. players
Partick Thistle F.C. players
East Kilbride F.C. players
Preston Athletic F.C. players
Fauldhouse United F.C. players
Scottish Football League players
Scottish expatriate footballers
Scottish expatriate sportspeople in Belgium
Expatriate footballers in Belgium
KFC Turnhout players